Carlos Gustavo Tamm de Araújo Moreira (born 8 February 1973) is a Brazilian mathematician working on dynamical systems, ergodic theory, number theory and combinatorics. Moreira is currently a researcher at the Instituto Nacional de Matemática Pura e Aplicada (IMPA), where he goes by the nickname "Gugu". He is also a member of the Brazilian Mathematical Olympiad Commission, a fanatic fan of the Brazilian football team Flamengo and a member of the Brazilian Communist Party (PCB). In October 2016, he achieved the mark of 5000 goals scored in his amateur football career. He maintains a record of his goals to show to the incredulous.

Moreira obtained his Ph.D. from IMPA  under the supervision of Jacob Palis in 1993, at the age of 20. He is a member of the Brazilian Academy of Sciences since 2008. In 2009 he was awarded the UMALCA Award for his contributions to mathematics.

Moreira is the recipient of the TWAS Prize in Mathematics in 2010. He was an invited speaker at the International Congress of Mathematicians of 2014 in Seoul, South Korea, and a plenary speaker at the 2018 International Congress of Mathematicians in Rio de Janeiro, Brazil.

Selected publications 
C. G. T. de A. Moreira and Jean-Christophe Yoccoz, "Stable intersections of regular Cantor sets with large Hausdorff dimensions," Annals of Mathematics 154 (1), 45−96 (2001). https://doi.org/10.2307/3062110
C. G. Moreira and Artur Avila, "Statistical properties of unimodal maps: the quadratic family," Annals of Mathematics 161 (2), 831−881 (2005). https://doi.org/10.4007/annals.2005.161.831
N. Alon, Y. Kohayakawa, C. Mauduit, C. G. Moreira, and V. Rödl, "Measures of pseudorandomness for finite sequences: typical values," Proceedings of the London Mathematical Society 95 (3), 778−812 (2007) https://doi.org/10.1112/plms/pdm027
C. G. Moreira, "Geometric properties of the Markov and Lagrange spectra," Annals of Mathematics 188 (1), 145−170 (2018). https://doi.org/10.4007/annals.2018.188.1.3

References 

1973 births
Members of the Brazilian Academy of Sciences
Living people
Instituto Nacional de Matemática Pura e Aplicada alumni
Instituto Nacional de Matemática Pura e Aplicada researchers
21st-century Brazilian mathematicians
TWAS laureates
Brazilian communists